The Czech National Council was the legislative body of the Czech Republic since 1968 when the Czech Republic was created as a member state of Czech-Slovak federation. It was legally transformed into the Chamber of Deputies according to the Constitution (Act. No. 1/1993 Coll.) because of the dissolution of Czechoslovakia in 1992.

Chairmen of the Czech National Council 

Čestmír Císař    1968-1969
Evžen Erban      1969-1981
Josef Kempný     1981-1989
Jaroslav Šafařík 1989-1990
Dagmar Burešová  1990-1992
Milan Uhde       1992-1992

See also
 Slovak National Council
 Federal Assembly (Czechoslovakia)

 
1968 establishments in Czechoslovakia
1992 disestablishments in Czechoslovakia
Defunct unicameral legislatures
Czechoslovak Socialist Republic